Health Inspectors is an American reality television series on the Food Network. The series debuted on October 26, 2012 and follows Ben Vaughn as he volunteers his time to various restaurateurs around the country, who need to renovate their restaurants.

Episodes

See also
 Public health inspector
 Environmental health officer

References

External links
 

2010s American reality television series
2012 American television series debuts
English-language television shows
Food Network original programming
2012 American television series endings